This is a list of members of the South Australian House of Assembly from 1938 to 1941, as elected at the 1938 state election:

 Light LCL MHA and Premier Richard Layton Butler resigned on 5 November 1938 in order to contest a by-election for the federal seat of Wakefield. LCL candidate Herbert Michael won the resulting by-election on 21 January 1939.
 Glenelg independent MHA William Fisk died on 18 December 1940. No by-election was held due to the imminent 1941 state election.
 Stirling independent MHA Herbert Dunn joined the LCL in 1940.

Members of South Australian parliaments by term
20th-century Australian politicians